Hyperandra appendiculata is a moth of the family Erebidae first described by Gottlieb August Wilhelm Herrich-Schäffer in 1856. It is found in French Guiana, Brazil and Venezuela.

References

 

Phaegopterina
Moths described in 1856